Ada Ellen Bayly (25 March 1857 – 8 February 1903), also known as Edna Lyall, was an English novelist, who "supported the women's suffrage movement from an early age."

Biography
Bayly was born in Brighton, the youngest of four children of a barrister. Early in life she lost both her parents, so that she spent her youth with an uncle in Surrey and in a Brighton private school. Bayly never married. She seems to have spent her adult life living with her two married sisters and her brother, a clergyman in Bosbury, Herefordshire.

In 1879, she published her first novel, Won by Waiting, under the pseudonym "Edna Lyall" (apparently derived from transposing letters from Ada Ellen Bayly). The book was not a success. Success came with We Two, based on the life of Charles Bradlaugh, a social reformer and advocate of free thought. Her historical novel In the Golden Days was the last book read to John Ruskin on his deathbed; while Hope the Hermit was a bestseller set in the Lake District and later an inspiration for Hugh Walpole's Rogue Herries. To Right the Wrong (2nd ed. 1894) is a historical novel about John Hampden and the English Civil War.

Bayly wrote in all eighteen novels, many of them offering interesting explorations of the writer's creative process. Part of her success was due to her practice of using characters from one novel in a different capacity in her next.

Selected works
Won by Waiting, 1879
Donovan, 1882
We Two, sequel of the former, 1884
In the Golden Days, 1885
Autobiography of a Slander, 1887
To Right the Wrong, 3 vols, 1894
Doreen: The Story of a Singer, 1894
The Autobiography of a Truth, 1896
Wayfaring Men: A Novel, 1896
Hope the Hermit, 1898
The Burgess Letters, 1902

See also

Citations

References

Further reading
G. A. Payne, Edna Lyell: An Appreciation (1903)

External links

 
 
 
 
 
Won by Waiting (1892) Appleton, New York (Google ebook)
 Golden Gale (all eighteen of her works of fiction)
Jesse Maria Escreet (1904) The life of Edna Lyall (Ada Ellen Bayly), Longmans, Green, and Co., London (Google ebook)

1857 births
1903 deaths
19th-century English novelists
19th-century English women writers
19th-century English writers
English women novelists
People from Brighton
English feminists